The Battle of Benadir was an armed engagement between the Ajuran Sultanate and the Portuguese Empire.

Background

After the Portuguese conducted a large-scale naval expedition to Suez in 1541, the Ottoman Empire dedicated greater resources into protecting the Red Sea from Portuguese intrusion. To such effect, about 25 galleys were armed and stationed at Aden.

The Portuguese captain of Sofala, João de Sepúlveda, was informed of the presence of these forces by allied Swahili city-states, mainly Malindi, who also reported that the hostile Ajuran Sultanate had appealed to the Ottomans for military support, in preparation for a rebellion against Portuguese suzerainty in the region. João de Sepúlveda thus set out with 6 small galleys and 100 soldiers to conduct a preemptive strike against the coastal cities of the Ajuran Sultanate. He was joined by an unrecorded number of vessels and warriors from Malindi.

Battle
According to João de Sepúlveda's own account, having arrived at Mogadishu he "destroyed the city and did them great damage and injury". Moving a few leagues north, he reached a popular anchorage for tradeships coming from the Red Sea, where he learned that the Turks would not be sailing to East Africa that year. Thus he returned to what remained of Mogadishu, and made a peace deal with its rulers. However, according to modern historians it's not likely that João de Sepúlveda's small fleet actually destroyed Mogadishu. Instead, it appears that the capture of one Ottoman ship and a brief firing upon the city was enough to compel the sultan of Mogadishu to sign a peace deal with the Portuguese.

Passing by Barawa, the city was sacked, in retaliation for its inhabitants having delivered a few Portuguese prisoners to the Turks. After also sealing a peace with Barawa, João de Sepúlveda returned to Malindi.

The word benadir means coast in Somali referring to the richness of southern Somali coast.

See also
 Battle of Barawa
 Ajuran Empire
 History of Somalia

References

Sources
 (translation from the German original Franz Xaver: Sein Leben und Seine Zeit II.1, Freiburg im Breisgau: Herder, 1963)
 

Ajuran Sultanate
Conflicts in 1542
Medieval Somalia
Benadir
1542 in the Portuguese Empire